Holoplatys apressus is a species of jumping spider endemic to New Zealand.

Description 
Holoplatys apressus are small with an unusually flat body (Which has been attributed to their habitat preference of small spaces under bark) that is typically black-brown with grey hairs covering the body. Adult males may have longitudinal black stripes along their abdomen.

Taxonomy 
Holoplatys apressus was first described as Salticus appresus in 1873. Independently, Raymond Comte de Dalmas described Holoplatys senilis in 1917. In 2002, S. appresus was moved to the Holoplatys genus and H. senilis was recognized as a synonym.

Habitat 
Holoplatys apressus can be found under the bark of Manuka and Kanuka trees. Some individuals have been found under the bark of exotic Pinus radiata and on driftwood, which has been suggested to imply that the species could have rafted from Australia.

References 

Salticidae
Spiders of New Zealand
Endemic fauna of New Zealand
Spiders described in 1873
Endemic spiders of New Zealand